Carlby is a small village and civil parish in the district of South Kesteven in Lincolnshire, England. The population of the civil parish at the 2011 census was 542.

It is located four miles south of Bourne on the A6121 near the Lincolnshire/Rutland boundary, which is partly the River West Glen.

The ecclesiastical parish is Ryhall with Essendine and Carlby, part of the Rutland Deanery of the Diocese of Peterborough. The vicar is the Rev Jo Saunders.

The parish church is dedicated to St. Stephen. The current building dates from 1134.

The village has a playing field and a children's recreational area. In 1986 the villagers replaced the wooden village hall with a brick structure.

References

External links

 A short page on Carlby
  List of parish organisations
 Draft development report, with much detail of history and buildings

Villages in Lincolnshire
Civil parishes in Lincolnshire
South Kesteven District